Aaron's Rod is a picaresque novel by D. H. Lawrence, started in 1918 and published in 1922.

Background
Lawrence began writing Aaron's Rod early in 1918, but abandoned the work after its first eleven chapters. The longer portion that finishes Aaron's Rod was written by Lawrence in 1921. The biblical title refers to the rod of Aaron in the Old Testament, Moses' brother who built the Golden Calf in the desert for the worship of the Israelites. The rod, his divine symbol of authority and independence, finds its echo in the flute of Aaron Sisson.

Synopsis
Aaron Sisson, a union official in the coal mines of the English Midlands, is trapped in a stale marriage. He is also an amateur, but talented, flautist. At the start of the story he walks out on his wife and two children and decides on impulse to visit Italy.  His dream is to become recognised as a professional musician. During his travels he encounters and befriends Rawdon Lilly, a Lawrence-like writer who nurses Aaron back to health when he is taken ill in post-war London. Having recovered his health, Aaron arrives in Florence. Here he moves in intellectual and artistic circles, argues about politics, leadership and submission, and has an affair with an aristocratic lady. The novel ends with an anarchist or fascist explosion that destroys Aaron’s instrument.

Publication history
Aaron's Rod was first published in the USA by Thomas Seltzer in April 1922, followed in June 1922 by the UK edition published by Martin Secker. In 1950, it was published in the United Kingdom by Penguin Books. In 1961, it was published in a Viking Compass Edition in the United States, and in 1976 it was published in the United States by Penguin Books.

Reception
The poet Richard Aldington commented that Aaron's Rod is a hastily written text, similar in this respect to Lawrence's novels The Lost Girl (1920) and Kangaroo (1923). He notes that there are inconsistencies from page to page, concerning details such as the names and backgrounds of Lawrence's characters. In his view, the novel's chapters are "improvised variations on Lawrence's own experience", and satirize people Lawrence knew. He sees the character Lilly as Lawrence himself, and Aaron as John Middleton Murry. He believes that the book's theme is Lawrence's gratification of his frustrated longing for an "utterly obedient and subservient disciple." He criticizes the book's early chapters, writing that they have little or nothing of Lawrence's "personal daimon", and lack the "thrilling eloquence and passionate poetry and subtle physical emotion of which he alone had the secret", while the book as a whole shows "the satirical Lawrence, not at his best, but almost at the level of spiteful gossip." According to Lawrence biographer Frances Wilson, Aldington himself is portrayed in Aaron's Rod: "Aldington is Robert Cunningham, 'a fresh, stoutish young Englishman in khaki.'"

References

External links 

 Digital facsimile at the Internet Archive
 

1922 British novels
Novels by D. H. Lawrence
Picaresque novels